The 1967 Victorian Football Association season was the 86th season of the top division of the Australian rules football competition, and the seventh season of second division competition. The Division 1 premiership was won by the Dandenong Football Club, after it defeated Port Melbourne in a controversial Grand Final on 24 September by 25 points; it was Dandenong's first Division 1 premiership. The Division 2 premiership was won by Oakleigh, in its first season after relegation from Division 1.

Division 1
The Division 1 home-and-home season was played over 18 rounds; the top four then contested the finals under the Page–McIntyre system. The finals were held for the first time at the Punt Road Oval, in Richmond.

Ladder

Finals

Grand Final

Dandenong won the Grand Final, which is best remembered for the controversial events of its second quarter. After seeing a free kick go against a teammate, Port Melbourne full forward John Peck approached and argued with umpire David Jackson. Jackson reported Peck for using abusive language and for disputing his decisions, and Peck repeatedly turned away from Jackson to prevent him from seeing his guernsey number to report him. Port Melbourne was already unhappy with the lopsided free kick count against it; and, after seeing this incident, Port Melbourne captain-coach Brian Buckley assembled his team to walk off the ground and forfeit the match in protest at Jackson's performance; much of the team had already reached the sidelines before Port Melbourne club officials ordered them to return to the ground. The rest of the game was played without incident, and Dandenong went on to win by 25 points.

Awards
The leading goalkicker for the season was Johnny Walker (Preston), who kicked 80 goals during the home-and-home season.
The J. J. Liston Trophy was won by Jim Sullivan (Coburg), who polled 38 votes. Paul Ladds (Sandringham) finished second with 27 votes, before he died in a car accident in the final week of the home-and-away season; Denis Dalton (Preston) and Rod Evans (Dandenong) were equal third with 22 votes.
Waverley won the seconds premiership. Waverley 13.19 (97) defeated Preston 11.4 (70) in the Grand Final, played as a stand-alone match on Saturday 23 September at Skinner Reserve before a crowd of 300.

Division 2
The Division 2 home-and-home season was played over eighteen rounds; the top four then contested the finals under the Page–McIntyre system. All finals were played on Sundays at Coburg Oval, after having been played at Toorak Park from 1961 until 1966; crowds at Coburg were much lower than they had been at Toorak Park, and finals returned to Toorak Park in 1968.

Ladder

Finals

Awards
The leading goalkicker for Division 2 was Frank Power (Mordialloc) who kicked 84 goals for the season.
The Division 2 Best and Fairest was originally won outright by Larry Rowe (Caulfield), who polled 22 votes, including seven first preferences; Colin Sleep (Northcote) originally finished in second place on a countback, polling 22 votes with five first preferences. However, following a decision in 1989, the countback was retrospectively eliminated, and both players are now recognized as joint Best and Fairest winners. Graeme Wapling (Oakleigh) was third with 19 votes.
Northcote won the seconds premiership, defeating Sunshine in the Grand Final Replay. In the Grand Final on Saturday 9 September, Northcote 13.11 (89) drew Sunshine 13.11 (89); in the Grand Final Replay on Sunday 17 September, Northcote 13.12 (90) defeated Sunshine 10.8 (68). Both matches were stand-alone games played at Skinner Reserve.

Notable events

Transfer fees
In early April, shortly before the start of the season, the Association Board on Management agreed by a 25–14 majority to impose a minimum transfer fee of $3,000 for any of its players. The fee was an attempt to stem the flow of young Association players to the Victorian Football League, and also to increase the financial reward to Association clubs for developing League-standard players if they did leave.

There were several problems which made the Association's move impractical. Outside the Association and among many clubs who had voted against the motion, the $3,000 price tag was considered to be outrageously and unrealistically high, considering that most of the players involved were young players being rated solely on their potential. Additionally, while transfer fees were an established practice in British and American football, there was not yet a formal transfer fee system within Australian football. Finally, the Victorian Football League's player payment laws (the "Coulter Laws") specifically prohibited the "buying" of players from other clubs – and therefore any club which paid a transfer fee to the Association would be in breach of League rules.

Shortly after the fee was imposed, the dissenting Association clubs led a campaign to repeal it, fearing reprisal from the League. True to these fears, the League Board of Management voted in late April to end its 1949 reciprocity agreement with the Association, allowing Association players to transfer directly to the League without a clearance; players who did so were suspended from the Association for five years, but the suspension was not recognised in the League. There were few such transfers over the following years, in part because players were reluctant to risk a five-year ban from the Association if they were never able to forge a successful League career. The highest profile move before the 1967 season was that of young Prahran centreman Kevin Sheedy, who went to  without a clearance and without Prahran receiving any of the $5,000 transfer fee which was set for him.

On 5 May, the Association Board of Management agreed by an overwhelming majority to reduce the minimum transfer fee to $500 per player (with a maximum of $5,000), after an earlier motion to rescind the minimum transfer fee entirely failed to gain the two-thirds majority it required. Despite the change, its reciprocity agreement with the League was not reinstated. The transfer fee rule remained in place until April 1969.

Other notable events
Starting from 1967, television channel ATV-0 (part of modern-day Network Ten) began to telecast Association games as part of its weekend sports coverage, in conjunction with its horse racing coverage. ATV-0 broadcast one live game on each Saturday and Sunday through the season, at a time when League games were generally televised only as partial replays. Over the following decade, the higher profile brought by television coverage resulted in a marked increase in the popularity of the Association, and attendances more than doubled between 1967 and 1975.
On 30 July, in a rematch of the previous two Grand Finals, Port Melbourne 16.14 (110) defeated Waverley 14.16 (100) at Central Reserve, after having trailed 8.6 (54) to 13.15 (93) by 39 points at three-quarter time.

External links
List of VFA/VFL premiers

References

Victorian Football League seasons
VFL